Combe Bottom is a  biological Site of Special Scientific Interest north of Shere in Surrey. It is designated a  Local Nature Reserve  called Shere Woodlands, and is managed by the Surrey Wildlife Trust.

This site on a slope of the North Downs is mainly woodland and scrub, with a small area of unimproved chalk grassland. The woodland is dominated by beech and yew. There is a wide variety of bryophytes, including the rare moss Herzogiella seligeri.

There is access from Staple Lane and Combe Lane.

References

Sites of Special Scientific Interest in Surrey